1st ADG Awards
1997

Feature Film: 
 The English Patient 
The 1st Art Directors Guild Excellence in Production Design Awards, honoring the best production designers in film, television and media of 1996, were held in 1997.

Winners and nominees

Film

Television

Special Achievement Award
 Gene Allen

Distinguished Career Award
 Allen Daviau

Lifetime Achievement Award
 Robert F. Boyle

References

Art Directors Guild Awards
1996 film awards
1996 in American cinema
1997 in American cinema